You, the Night, and Candlelight is the Valentine's Day EP of singer-songwriter Dave Barnes. It was released on February 3, 2009, between his third and fourth studio album.

Track listing
"Loving You, Loving Me" – 5:01
"I Have and Always Will" – 4:06
"My Girl" – 3:09
"Until You" – 4:41
"Home – 3:31

External links
 Dave Barnes' Myspace
 Dave Barnes' Official Website

2009 EPs
Dave Barnes albums